Pietracamela (locally La Pròtë)  is a town and comune in Teramo province in the Abruzzo region of eastern Italy. It is located at the feet of the Gran Sasso massif, in the natural park known as the "Gran Sasso e Monti della Laga National Park".

Cities and towns in Abruzzo
Hilltowns in Abruzzo
Ski areas and resorts in Italy